Tolgoyek (Tolgoyok) is a rural locality (a selo) in Chemalskoye Rural Settlement of Chemalsky District, the Altai Republic, Russia. The population was 153 as of 2016. There is 1 street.

Geography 
Tolgoyek is located in the valley of the Katun River, 12 km southeast of Chemal (the district's administrative centre) by road. Chemal is the nearest rural locality.

References 

Rural localities in Chemalsky District